The 1909–10 VMI Keydets basketball team represented the Virginia Military Institute in their second ever season of basketball. The Keydets were coached by F. J. Pratt and held a 2–5 record by year's end. They played their games out of the Lexington Skating Rink.

Schedule

See also 
VMI Keydets
VMI Keydets men's basketball

References

External links
 Official men's basketball Site

VMI Keydets basketball seasons
Vmi